Het Klaverblad (The Cloverleaf) is a small wooden saw mill, located in the Zaanse Schans, in the municipality of Zaanstad.

The mill was built by Ru Pos on the site of the previous KROMO warehouse. This private initiative was turned into foundation "Het Klaverblad" with the purpose of building, running and maintaining the sawmill. The sails of the mill first turned in 2005.

See also 

 De Kat
 De Huisman
 De Os
 De Zoeker
 De Gekroonde Poelenburg
 De Bonte Hen

External links 
 De website van de molen

Windmills in North Holland
Hollow post mills in the Netherlands
Windmills completed in 2005
Zaandam